Mikhail Mikhaylovich Stopanovsky (born 1830 in Ekaterinoslav, Imperial Russia, — died 27 (old style: 15) March 1877, Saint Petersburg, Imperial Russia) was a Russian writer, journalist and publicist. He started out in Iskra, which he soon became part of the stuff of and took upon himself the quite popular Life in Province section, then became a regular contributor to Budilnik. He is best known for his novel Oblichiteli (Обличители, The Accusers) first published by Otechestvennye Zapiski in 1862 (Issues 1—4, 6—8). Stopanovsky's other works of note include the novels Zapiski Skupovo (Записки скупого, The Notes of a Miser, 1857) and Zateryannye Lyudi (Затерянные люди, The Lost People, 1860).

References 

Russian journalists
Writers from Dnipro
1830 births
1877 deaths